James Turner Morehead (January 11, 1799 – May 5, 1875) was the younger brother of North Carolina Governor John Motley Morehead and a Congressional Representative from North Carolina.

He was born in Rockingham County, North Carolina, on January 11, 1799; he attended the common schools and graduated from the University of North Carolina at Chapel Hill in 1819. A lawyer, Morehead studied law, was admitted to the bar and commenced practice in Greensboro, North Carolina, before going into politics. First, he served as commissioner of Greensboro in 1832, 1834, and 1835; then as a member of the North Carolina Senate in 1835, 1836, 1838, 1840, and 1842. He was also a trustee of his alma mater, the University of North Carolina, from 1836 to 1868.

In 1850, he was elected as a Whig to the Thirty-second Congress (March 4, 1851 - March 4, 1853); after his term was up, he declined to be a candidate for renomination in 1852 to the Thirty-third Congress.

After retiring from national politics, he resumed the practice of his profession, and also engaged in agricultural pursuits and operated an iron works. Morehead died in Greensboro, N.C., on May 5, 1875. He is interred in the Presbyterian Cemetery there.

See also 
Thirty-second United States Congress

References

External links
U.S. Congressional Biographical Directory
 John Motley Morehead : 200th birthday celebration, 1796-1996 / Robert Lindsay Morehead, Anne Fulcher Nelson, Charles E. Lovelace, Jr.
NCpedia 
 The King of Rockingham Country and the Original Bridge to Nowhere - The Story of B.F. Mebane 
 The Morehead Family of North Carolina and Virginia 

1799 births
1875 deaths
People from Rockingham County, North Carolina
Morehead family
American people of Scottish descent
Whig Party members of the United States House of Representatives from North Carolina
North Carolina state senators
19th-century American businesspeople